The 16th Santosham Film Awards is an awards ceremony held at Hyderabad, India on 26 August 2018 recognized the best films and performances from the Tollywood films and music released in 2017, along with special honors for lifetime contributions and a few special awards. The awards are annually presented by Santosham magazine. The ceremony was announced on 3 August 2018 with Srikanth being the chief guest.

Honorary Awards 

 Santosham Lifetime Achievement Award – S. Janaki
 Santosham Sridevi Smarakam Award – Tamannaah
 Santosham Allu Ramalingaiah Smarakam Award – Brahmaji
 Santosham Daggubati Ramanaidu Smarakam Award – Yerneni Naveen and Yelamanchili Ravi Shankar (Mythri Movie Makers)
 Santosham Akkineni Nageswara Rao Smarakam Award – Rajendra Prasad

Main Awards

Film

Music

Special Jury Awards 

 Special Jury Award (Alexander) – Jaya Prakash Reddy
 Special Jury Award for Best Actress – Mehreen for Mahanubhavudu (2017)
 Special Jury Award for Best Actress – Eesha Rebba for Ami Thumi (2017)
Special Jury Award for Best Actress – Mannara Chopra for Rogue (2017)

Presenters

Performers 

 Payal Rajput
 Mehreen Pirzada

References 

Santosham Film Awards
2016 Indian film awards
2016 film awards